The 2014 Durand Cup Final was a football match on 8 November 2014 at Raia Sports Complex, Raia, Goa. It was the final match of the 2014 Durand Cup, the 127th season of the Durand Cup, a football competition for Indian football system.

Salgaocar F.C. won the cup by defeating Pune F.C. 1–0.

Route to the final

Salgaocar

Salgaocar begin their campaign with 4–1 win against Indian Navy FC in the quarter finals. In the second game, they could manage only a 1–1 draw against Laxmi Prasad S.C., but it was good enough to place them in the semi-finals against I-League champions, Bengaluru FC. In the semi-finals, after the goalless regulation time and extra time Salgaocar managed to score all the penalties while Bengaluru missed one and Salgaocar entered the finals.

Pune

Pune won their group by winning both the games, the first against Churchill Brothers 3-0 and the second 1–0 against Vasco. In the semi-finals, they faced Group B winner Sporting Clube de Goa. In the semi-finals, Pune won 2–1 and entered the finals.

References

1
Durand Cup finals
2014–15 in Indian football